Oreta paki is a moth in the family Drepanidae. It was described by Hiroshi Inoue in 1964. It is found in Korea, China (Heilongjiang, Jilin, Liaoning) and the Russian Far East.

References

Moths described in 1964
Drepaninae